M.O.M. - Mission Over Mars is a 2019 Indian Hindi drama web series created by Ekta Kapoor. The series is developed and produced by Endemol Shine India for online streaming platforms ALTBalaji and ZEE5. The series stars Sakshi Tanwar, Mona Singh, Nidhi Singh and Palomi Ghosh as protagonists.

Plot
The series is an intriguing tale of four female scientists who through their brilliance and dedication chart the journey of Indian Space Agency's Mars Orbiter Mission. Mission Over Mars begins with a disappointing moment as ISRO's namesake ISA fails in its Chandravimaan mission and the entire blame falls on the shoulders of Moushmi Ghosh. It touches a nerve given Chandrayaan-2's Vikram Lander losing control after it landed on the moon's South Pole. Moushmi shines through as she plays a hot-headed scientist, forced to work with her ex-husband, a fellow scientist at the same space centre. Clad in crisp cotton saris, Moushmi Ghosh is dedicated to her dream but forgets to remember her only daughter's birthday. Nandita Hariprasad is her opposite—a calm and quiet mission coordinator who is a helicopter mom to her 18-year-old son.

The series has been criticised for showing men in the work place as predators. The underlying narrative of the series has been men hating and glorifying women being superior over men.

Cast 
 Sakshi Tanwar as Nandita Hariprasad
 Mona Singh as Moushmi Ghosh
 Nidhi Singh as Neetu Sinha
 Palomi Ghosh as Meghan
 Ashish Vidyarthi as K. Murlidharan
 Mohan Joshi as Sharad Gokhale
 Chittaranjan Tripathy as Binayak Mohanty
 Utkarsh Majumdar as Bhaskar Ghosh
 Naisha Khanna as Lilavati Bhalekar
 Gaurav Sharma as Nikhil Bhalekar
 Suhaas Ahuja as Rajat Sinha
 Mihir Ahuja as Param Hariprasad
 Mona Ambegoankar as Sunita Vyas
 Purnendu Bhattacharya as Mayank
 Harssh Singh as Anant Vardhan
 Priyank Tiwari as Rakesh
 Nishit Broker as Swami
 Ankur Rathee as Gautam Gulati
 Pranav Manchanda as Venkat
 Micky Makhija as Jeejabhoy
 Manu Malik as Alok Hariprasad

Episodes

References

External links 
 
 Mission Over Mars on ALTBalaji
Mission Over Mars on ZEE5

2019 web series debuts
Indian drama web series
ALTBalaji original programming
Hindi-language web series
ZEE5 original programming
Indian Space Research Organisation in fiction